Haida  is the language of the Haida people, spoken in the Haida Gwaii archipelago off the coast of Canada and on Prince of Wales Island in Alaska. An endangered language, Haida currently has 24 native speakers, though revitalization efforts are underway. Epidemics soon led to a drastic reduction in the Haida population, which became limited to three villages: Masset, Skidegate, and Hydaburg. Positive attitudes towards assimilation combined with the ban on speaking Haida in residential schools led to a sharp decline in the use of the Haida language among the Haida people, and today almost all ethnic Haida use English to communicate.

Classification of the Haida language is a matter of controversy, with some linguists placing it in the Na-Dené language family and others arguing that it is a language isolate. Haida itself is split between Northern and Southern dialects, which differ primarily in phonology. The Northern Haida dialects have developed pharyngeal consonants, typologically uncommon sounds which are also found in some of the nearby Salishan and Wakashan languages.

The Haida sound system includes ejective consonants, glottalized sonorants, contrastive vowel length, and phonemic tone. The nature of tone differs between the dialects, and in Alaskan Haida it is primarily a pitch accent system. Syllabic laterals appear in all dialects of Haida, but are only phonemic in Skidegate Haida. Extra vowels which are not present in Haida words occur in nonsense words in Haida songs. There are a number of systems for writing Haida using the Latin alphabet, each of which represents the sounds of Haida differently.

While Haida has nouns and verbs, it does not have adjectives and has few true adpositions. English adjectives translate into verbs in Haida, for example  "(to be) good", and English prepositional phrases are usually expressed with Haida "relational nouns", for instance Alaskan Haida  'side facing away from the beach, towards the woods'. Haida verbs are marked for tense, aspect, mood, and evidentiality, and person is marked by pronouns that are cliticized to the verb. Haida also has hundreds of classifiers. Haida has the rare direct-inverse word order type, where both SOV and OSV words orders occur depending on the "potency" of the subject and object of the verb. Haida also has obligatory possession, where certain types of nouns cannot stand alone and require a possessor.

History
The first documented contact between the Haida and Europeans was in 1772, on Juan Pérez's exploratory voyage. The precontact Haida population was about 15,000; the first smallpox epidemic came soon after initial contact, reducing the population to about 10,000 and depopulating a large portion of the Ninstints dialect area. The next epidemic came in 1862, causing the population to drop to 1,658. Venereal disease and tuberculosis further reduced the population to 588 by 1915. This dramatic decline led to the merger of villages, the final result being three Haida villages: Masset (merged 1876), Skidegate (merged 1879), and Hydaburg (merged 1911).

In the 1830s a pidgin trade language based on Haida, known as Haida Jargon, was used in the islands by speakers of English, Haida, Coast Tsimshian, and Heiltsuk. The Fraser Canyon Gold Rush of 1858 led to a boom in the town of Victoria, and Southern Haida began traveling there annually, mainly for the purpose of selling their women. For this the Haida used Chinook Jargon. This contact with whites had a strong effect on the Southern Haida, even as the Northern Haida remained culturally conservative. For instance, Skidegate Haida were reported as dressing in the European fashion in 1866, while Northern Haida "were still wearing bearskins and blankets ten years later."

In 1862, William Duncan, a British Anglican missionary stationed at Fort Simpson, took fifty Tsimshian converts and created a new model community, Metlakatla, in Alaska. The new village was greatly successful, and throughout the Northwest coast the attitude spread that abandoning tradition would pave the way for a better life. The Haida themselves invited missionaries to their community, the first arriving in 1876. These missionaries initially worked in the Haida language.

The Rev. John Henry Keen translated the Book of Common Prayer into Haida, published in 1899 in London by the Church Mission Society. The book of Psalms as well as 3 Gospels and Acts from the New Testament would also be translated into Haida. However, negative attitudes towards the use of the Haida language were widespread among the Haida people, even in the fairly conservative village of Masset where Keen was located. In an 1894 letter, Keen wrote:

Beginning at the turn of the century, Haida began sending their children to residential schools. This practice was most widespread among the Southern Haida; among the Northern Haida it was practiced by the more "progressive" families. These schools strictly enforced a ban on the use of native languages, and played a major role in the decimation of native Northwest Coast languages. The practice of Haida families using English to address children spread in Masset in the 1930s, having already been practiced in Skidegate, the rationale being that this would aid the children in their school education. After this point few children were raised with Haida as a primary language.

Status

Today most Haida do not speak the Haida language.  The language is listed as "critically endangered" in UNESCO's Atlas of the World's Languages in Danger, with nearly all speakers elderly. As of 2003, most speakers of Haida are between 70 and 80 years of age, though they speak a "considerably simplified" form of Haida, and comprehension of the language is mostly limited to persons above the age of 50. The language is rarely used even among the remaining speakers and comprehenders.

The Haida have a renewed interest in their traditional culture, and are now funding Haida language programs in schools in the three Haida communities, though these have been ineffectual. Haida classes are available in many Haida communities and can be taken at the University of Alaska Southeast in Juneau, Ketchikan, and Hydaburg. A Skidegate Haida language app is available for iPhone, based on a "bilingual dictionary and phrase collection  words and phrases archived at the online Aboriginal language database FirstVoices.com."

In 2017 Kingulliit Productions was working on the first feature film to be acted entirely in Haida; the actors had to be trained to pronounce the lines correctly. The film, entitled SGaawaay K’uuna ("Edge of the Knife"), was due to be released in the United Kingdom in April 2019.

Classification
Franz Boas first suggested that Haida might be genetically related to the Tlingit language in  1894, and linguist Edward Sapir included Haida in the Na-Dené language family in 1915. This position was later supported by others, including Swanton, Pinnow, and Greenberg and Ruhlen. Today, however, many linguists regard Haida as a language isolate. This theory is not universally accepted; for example, Enrico (2004) argues that Haida does in fact belong to the Na-Dené family, though early loanwords make the evidence problematic. A proposal linking Na-Dené to the Yeniseian family of central Siberia finds no evidence for including Haida.

Dialects
Haida has a major dialectal division between Northern and Southern dialects. Northern Haida is split into Alaskan (or Kaigani) Haida and Masset (or North Graham Island) Haida. Southern Haida was originally split into Skidegate Haida and Ninstints Haida, but Ninstints Haida is now extinct and is poorly documented. The dialects differ in phonology and to some extent vocabulary; however, they are grammatically mostly identical.

Northern Haida is notable for its pharyngeal consonants. Pharyngeal consonants are rare among the world's languages, even in North America. They are an areal feature of some languages in a small portion of Northwest America, in the Salishan and Wakashan languages as well as Haida. The pharyngeal consonants of Wakashan and Northern Haida are known to have developed recently.

Phonology

Consonants

  The plain stops are partially voiced in syllable-initial position.
  For some speakers,  occurs only at the beginning of syllables, while  does not occur there, making them allophones of the same phoneme.
  In Northern Haida (Masset Haida and Alaskan Haida),  historically developed into , with  then being reintroduced by occasional borrowings from Southern Haida, Tlingit, Tsimshian, and Chinook jargon. The actual realization of the pharyngeal consonants  varies with dialect. In Masset Haida they are pharyngeal fricatives, whereas in the variety of Alaskan Haida spoken in Hydaburg they have been described as an epiglottal trill  and a trilled epiglottal affricate  or an epiglottal stop  respectively.

In Skidegate Haida,  has allophone  in syllable-final position.

Masset Haida phonology is complicated by various spreading processes caused by contiguous sonorants across morpheme boundaries, caused by loss of consonants in morpheme-initial position.

Vowels

The high vowels  may be realized as upper mid to high and include lax as well as tense values.

Alaskan Haida has neither of these, but has a diphthong , introduced from contraction of low-toned  and  sequences.

In Skidegate Haida, some instances of the vowel  are on an underlying level unspecified for quality; Enrico (2003) marks specified  with the symbol  . Unspecified  becomes  after ,  after (non-lateral) alveolar and palatal consonants, and syllabic  after lateral consonants. This does not exist in Masset Haida. A small class of Masset Haida words has a new vowel in place of this unspecified vowel which differs in quality from the vowel . 

Though quite variable in realization, it has an allophone  when occurring after uvular and epiglottal consonants.

 The short vowels do not contrast after the alveolar and postalveolar fricatives and affricates.
 No contrast exists between long high vowels and short high vowels followed by a semivowel.
 Long vowels are shortened before syllable-final glottal consonants, the high vowels  also before sonorant (nasal or approximant) consonants. Where productive, this is a late process that applies after the preceding neutralizations, so that e.g.

The vowels  and short  occur in nonsense syllables in Haida songs.

Tone
Haida features phonemic tone, the nature of which differs by dialect.

The Canadian dialects (Skidegate and Masset) have a tone system with low functional load. Unmarked heavy syllables (those with long vowels or ending in sonorants) have high pitch, and unmarked light syllables have low pitch:   "dog",   "sapwood". Examples of marked syllables include  "among" (Masset),  "tiny" (Skidegate). In Masset Haida marked low tone syllables are more common, resulting from elision of intervocalic consonants: compare Skidegate  to Masset  "net". Some alternations may be interpreted as results of syllable parsing rather than marked tone: compare Masset   "muskreg" to  'be suspicious of' , where  marks a syllable boundary.

In Skidegate Haida, short vowels which do not have marked tone are phonetically lengthened when they are in a word-initial open syllable, thus   "grass" becomes   "grassy".

In Masset Haida, marked low tone syllables have extra length, thus  "thing",  "mother".

In Kaigani, the system is primarily one of pitch accent, with at most one syllable per word featuring high tone in most words, though there are some exceptions (e.g.  "almost"), and it is not always clear what should be considered an independent "word". High tone syllables are usually heavy (having a long vowel or ending in a sonorant).

Phonotactics
The syllable template in Haida is (C(C(C))V(V)(C(C)). In Skidegate Haida the two unaspirated stops /p t/ can occur in the syllable coda, while none of the other unaspirated or aspirated stops can. Would-be final  in loanwords may be nativized to zero.

In Skidegate Haida a long syllabic lateral may appear in VV position, e.g.  "sew". Historically this developed from long  after a lateral consonant, but a few Skidegate words retain  in this position, e.g.  "inside",  "mountain goat wool". Syllabic resonants occur frequently in Masset Haida and occasionally in Kaigani Haida, but they are not present on the phonemic level.

First orthography
Several orthographies have been devised for writing Haida. The first alphabet was devised by the missionary Charles Harrison of the Church Mission Society who translated some Old Testament Stories in the Haida Language, and some New Testament books.  These were published by the British and Foreign Bible Society with the Haida Gospel of Matthew in 1891, Haida Gospel of Luke in 1899 and the Haida Gospel of John in 1899, and the book of Acts in Haida in the 1890s.

Modern orthography
Another alphabet was devised by Alaska Native Language Center (ANLC) for Kaigani Haida in 1972, based on Tlingit orthographic conventions, and is still in use. Robert Bringhurst, for his publications on Haida literature, created an orthography without punctuation or numerals, and few apostrophes; and in 2008 the Skidegate Haida Immersion Program (SHIP) created another, which is the usual orthography used in Skidegate. Other systems have been used by isolated linguists. Haida consonants are represented as follows.

Bringhurst uses a raised dot for the same, . The Enrico orthography uses  (or  when long) for the syllabic lateral in Skidegate Haida, e.g. .

The following are how Haida vowels are written:

Enrico (2003) uses  for some instances of  based on morphophonemics. Alaskan Haida also has a diphthong written . Enrico & Stuart (1996) use  for the vowels  that occur in nonsense syllables in songs. The Alaskan Haida orthography was updated in 2010 by Jordan Lachler.

Grammar

Morphology
The word classes in Haida are nouns, verbs, postpositions, demonstratives, quantifiers, adverbs, clitics, exclamations, replies, classifiers, and instrumentals. Unlike in English, adjectives and some words for people are expressed with verbs, e.g.  "(to be a) woman",  "(to be) good".  Haida morphology is mostly suffixing. Prefixation is only used to form "complex verbs", made up of a nominal classifier or instrumental plus a bound root, for instance Skidegate  "pick up stick-object" and  "pick up several (small objects) together, with tongs", which share the root  "pick up". Infixation occurs with some stative verbs derived from classifiers, for instance the classifier  plus the stative suffix  becomes .

The definite article is suffixed . Some nouns, especially verbal nouns ending in long vowels and loan words, take  instead, often accompanied by shortening or eliding preceding . Haida also has a partitive article , referring to "part of something or ... to one or more objects of a given group or category," e.g. 'he is making a boat (a member of the category of boats).' Partitive nouns are never definite, so the two articles never co-occur.

Personal pronouns occur in independent and clitic forms, which may each be in either agentive or objective form; first and second person pronouns also have separate singular and plural forms. The third person pronoun is only used for animates, though for possession  (lit. "this one") may be used; after relational nouns and prepositions  (lit. "it, that place, there") is used instead.

Number is not marked in most nouns, but is marked in certain cases in verbs. "my grandfathers". A few verbs have suppletive plural forms, as in many other North American languages. In addition, Haida has a plural verb suffix  (Skidegate)  (Masset)  /  (Kaigani) that is used to indicate that some third person pronoun in the sentence is plural, and to mark plural subject in imperatives. The third person pronoun that is pluralized can have any grammatical function, e.g. "I bought all their fish" (Masset).

Most nouns referring to family relationships have special vocative forms, e.g.  (Alaskan)  (Masset) "grandfather!"

Haida uses so-called "relational nouns" referring to temporal and spatial relations in place of most prepositions or prepositional phrases in English. Many of these are formed with the suffix , or in Alaskan Haida more often . For example, Haida  /  /  "surface" likely comes from  "back (noun)", and Alaskan Haida  "side facing away from the beach, towards the woods" comes from the noun  "away from the beach, place in the woods". These contrast with "local nouns", which refer to localities and do not occur with possessive pronouns, e.g. "above, up". Some local nouns have an optional prefix  which does not have semantic value. Both relational and local nouns may take the areal suffix  to refer to the entire area rather than a particular location, so for example  means "[at some place] on its surface" while  means "its surface area".

The Alaskan postpositions  "to" and  "from" (Skidegate) fuse to the preceding word.

Haida verbs have three basic forms: the present, the past, and the inferential forms. The past and inferential forms are both used to refer to events in the past, but differ in evidentiality: the inferential marks that the speaker was informed of or inferred the event rather than having experienced it personally. The bare present form refer to present-tense events, while future is formed with the suffix , using a present-form verb, e.g.  "he will go". The interrogative past form, made from the inferential form by removing final , is used in place of both past and inferential forms in sentences with question words.

There are four  classes of verb stems:

Imperatives are marked with the particle  after the first phrase in the sentence, or  after the verb word (the verb dropping final weak  if present) if there is no non-verbal phrase. Verbs are negated with the negative suffix , usually with the negative word  "not" in sentence-head position. Verbs drop weak  before this suffix, e.g. "he is not doing it that way".

Haida uses instrumental prefixes, classificatory prefixes, and directional suffixes to derive verbs. Some verb stems, known as bound stems, must occur with at least one such affix; for example  "strike once" requires an instrumental prefix.

Haida has a large number of classifiers (on the order of 475). These have a limited number of rhyme structures, which relate to each other ideophonically.

Numerals are generally treated as verbs in Haida, e.g.  "I have eight children" (literally "my children are eight"). For some types of objects, classificatory prefixes are used, e.g.  "two land otters" ( = small animal or fish).

Nouns and verbs that end in a vowel undergo glide formation (if the final vowel is high) or truncation (otherwise) before vowel-initial prefixes. Some vowel-initial suffixes cause nouns and verbs which are consonant-final and polysyllabic to undergo Final Syllable Shortening (FSS).
  "high water" +  'DF' →  (Masset)
  "foot" +  "own" →  (Skidegate)
  "bladder" +  "own" →  (Masset)

In Masset Haida, final short vowels in polysyllabic verbs are lengthened in sentence-final position: compare Masset  to Skidegate  "Give it to me".

Syntax
Haida clauses are verb-final. SOV word order is always possible, while OSV may also be used when the subject is more 'potent' than the object; thus Haida is a direct–inverse language. For example, a human is more potent than a horse, which is more potent than a wagon. Thus the Masset Haida sentence  can only mean "truly Bill likes the dog", while  can mean either "truly the dog likes Bill" or "truly Bill likes the dog". The determinants of potency are complex and include "acquaintance, social rank, humanness, animacy.. number ... [and] gender was also important at least in the two southern dialects." The following groups are listed in descending order of potency: "known single adult free humans; non-adult and/or enslaved and/or unknown and/or grouped humans; non-human higher animals; inanimates and lower organisms (fish and lower)." Grammatical definiteness does not affect potency.

Pronouns are placed adjacent to the verb and cliticized to it. Their internal order is object–subject, or in causatives object-causee-subject, for example  Bill me you punch-direct.that-PA "You told Bill to punch me / Bill told you to punch me". Potency is also relevant for pronoun ordering when one pronoun is less potent, for example the indefinite pronoun  in  =  'she took some.' Sentences with  "someone" or  "some people" as the subject may be translated as passive sentences in English, for example  "he was seen (by more than one person)", literally "some people saw him".

Clitic pronouns are used as complements of verbs, as inalienable possessives, with quantifiers, and in Skidegate Haida as the objects of some postpositions. Independent pronouns are used everywhere else. Agentive pronouns are marked and are only used as subjects of some verbs. Verbs taking agentive subjects are most common in the lexicon (about 69%), followed by those taking objective subjects (29%) and those that may take either (2%). Intransitive verbs of inherent states (e.g. "be old") take an objective subject, while most transitive verbs take agentive subjects (but cf. verbs like  "like"). With some verbs that may take either, there may be a semantic difference involved, e.g.  (Masset) which means "refuse" with agentive subject but not want with objective subject. Enrico (2003) argues that the agentive case indicates planning; thus Haida is essentially an active–stative language, though subject case is also variable in some transitive verbs.

Enclitics are placed after the first phrase in the sentence, usually a noun phrase (except with the imperative clitic  which follows a verb phrase). Independent pronouns are used instead of clitic pronouns when modified by a clitic, so for example  "he got well" becomes  "he also got well" when the clitic  'also, too' is added. The enclitics  and  follow other enclitics.

Focus and less commonly topic are marked with the clitic , placed after a sentence-initial constituent, e.g.  (Skidegate) "Bill saw Mary" / "Mary saw Bill",  "That one, he was called 'qaagaa. Question words always take this enclitic, for example  "what?",  "where?",  "when?".

There are multiple ways that Haida marks possession. Haida has obligatory possession, a common feature of native North American languages where certain nouns (in Haida, family relationship, body part, and "relational" nouns) must occur with a possessor and cannot stand alone. For example, one can say  "my mother" but not *, though one may use a circumlocution like  'one who is a mother'. These nouns are possessed using the bound objective pronouns, which all precede the noun except  'one's own'. Included in the class of obligatorily possessed nouns are so-called "relational nouns" and postpositions, which generally translate to prepositions or prepositional phrases in English and refer to temporal and spatial relations.

Relational nouns take some special third person possessive pronouns ( rather than ), e.g.  "in(side) it" (lit. "its interior"). Non-obligatory possession nouns are possessed by putting them in definite form after the possessor (a noun or a bound objective pronoun) in partitive form, e.g.  "our knife". An alternate construction when the possessor is a pronoun is to place an independent objective pronoun after the possessed noun, the latter in definite form, e.g.  "my house". The independent objective pronouns also occur by themselves with possessive force, e.g.  "mine".

Examples

Phrases in the Alaskan dialect

Notes

References

Bibliography

Other publications

 Andersen, Doris. 1974. "Slave of the Haida." Toronto: Macmillan Co. of Canada.
 Bengtson, John D. (2008), "Materials for a Comparative Grammar of the Dene–Caucasian (Sino-Caucasian) Languages." Aspects of Comparative Linguistics, vol. 3, Moscow: RSUH Publishers, pp. 45–118
 Dauenhauer, Nora Marks. 2008. "The Battles of Sitka, 1802 and 1804, Anooshi Lingit Aani Ka, Russians in Tlingit America." University of Washington Press.
 
 Dürr, Michael & Egon Renner. 1995. The History of the Na-Dene Controversy: A Sketch. Language and Culture in North America: Studies in Honor of Heinz-Jürgen Pinnow, ed. by Renner, Egon & Dürr, Michael. 3-18. (Lincom Studies in Native American Linguistics 2). Munich: Lincom Europa.
 Enrico, John. 1983a. "The Haida Language." The Outer Shores, edited by Scudder, G. E. and Gessler, Nicholas. Queen Charlotte City, B.C.: Queen Charlotte Islands Museum Press. pp. 223–248.
 Enrico, John. 1983b. "Tense in the Haida Relative Clause." International Journal of American Linguistics 52:91–123.
 Enrico, John. 1986. "Word Order, Focus and Topic in Haida." International Journal of American Linguistics 49:136–166.
 Enrico, John. 1991. The Lexical Phonology of Masset Haida. (Alaska Native Language Center Research Papers, 8.) Fairbanks: Alaska Native Language Center.
 Enrico, John. 1998. "Remarks on Pitch in Skidegate Haida." Gengo Kenkyu 12:115–120.
 Enrico, John. 2003. Haida Syntax. (2 volumes). Lincoln, NE: University of Nebraska Press.
 Enrico, John. 2005. Haida Dictionary: Skidegate, Masset, and Alaskan Dialects. (2 volumes). Fairbanks: Alaska Native Language Center; Juneau: Sealaska Heritage Institute.
 Fisher, Robin. 1992. "Contact and Conflict: Indian-European Relations in British Columbia, 1774–1890." UBC Press.
 Greenberg, J.H. 1987a. Language in the Americas. Stanford, CA: Stanford University Press.
 Greenberg, J.H. 1987b. "The Na-Dene Problem". In Greenberg (1987a), pp. 321–330.
 Harrison, Charles. 1925. "Ancient Warriors of the North Pacific; The Haidas, Their Laws, Customs and Legends." London, H. F. & G. Witherby.
 
 
 
 Levine, Robert D. 1979. Haida and Na-Dene: A New Look at the Evidence. International Journal of American Linguistics 45(2).157–70.
 Manaster Ramer, Alexis. 1996. "Sapir's Classifications: Haida and the Other Na Dene languages." Anthropological Linguistics 38:179–215.
 Pinnow, Heinz-Jürgen. 1976. Geschichte der Na-Dene-Forschung. (Indiana : Beihefte; 5). Berlin: Mann. 
 Pinnow. H-J. 1985. Das Haida als Na-Dene Sprache. (Abhandlungen der völkerkundlichen Arbeitsgemeinschaft, Hefte 43–46.) Nortorf, Germany: Völkerkundliche Arbeitsgemeinschaft.
 Pinnow. H-J. 2006a. Die Na-Dene-Sprachen im Lichte der Greenberg-Klassifikation. / The Na-Déné Languages in Light of Greenberg's Classification. Zweite erweiterte Auflage / Second revised edition. Bredstedt: Druckerei Lempfert.
 Pinnow. H-J. 2006b. Sprachhistorische Untersuchung zur Stellung des Haida als Na-Dene-Sprache. (Unveränderte Neuausgabe aus INDIANA 10, Gedenkschrift Gerdt Kutscher. Teil 2. Berlin 1985. Mit einem Anhang = Die Na-Dene-Sprachen im Verhältnis zum Tibeto-Chinesischen.) Bredstedt: Druckerei Lempfert.
 Rosman, Abraham. 1971. "Feasting with Mine Enemy: Rank and Exchange among Northwest Coast Societies" Columbia University Press.
 Ruhlen M. 1998. "The Origin of the Na-Dene". Proceedings of the National Academy of Sciences of the United States of America. 95, no. 23: 13994-6.
 Sapir, Edward. 1915. The Na-Dene Languages: A Preliminary Report. American Anthropologist 17.534–558.
 Stearns, Mary Lee. 1981. "Haida Culture in Custody." University of Washington Press.
 Swanton, John R. 1905. Haida Texts and Myths. Skidegate dialect. (Bureau of American Ethnology Bulletin 29.) Washington, D.C.: Smithsonian Institution.
 Swanton, John R. 1908. Haida Texts. Masset Dialect. (Memoirs of the American Museum of Natural History, vol. 10, part 2.) Leiden: E. J. Brill.

External links
 Haida language
 Listen to the sounds of Haida
 Skidegate Haida Portal, First Voices
 Raven, a story in the Haida language
 Haida writing systems
 Haida linguistics bibliography
 The Book of Common Prayer in Haida
 How to count in Haida
 FirstVoices Haida iPhone App
 FirstVoices Haida Online Dictionary
 Haida basic lexicon at the Global Lexicostatistical Database
ELAR archive of Northern (Massett) Haida language documentation materials 
 Dictionary of Alaska Haida
 Alaskan Haida Phrasebook
 Northern Haida (Intercontinental Dictionary Series)

 
 
Language isolates of North America
Indigenous languages of the Pacific Northwest Coast
Northern Northwest Coast Sprachbund (North America)
Northwest Coast Sprachbund (North America)
Indigenous languages of Alaska
First Nations languages in Canada
Tonal languages
Endangered language isolates
Native American language revitalization
Official languages of Alaska